The Panama national baseball team (Spanish: Selección de béisbol de Panamá) is the baseball team that represents Panama at an international level. Along with Nicaragua, they are considered to be the best baseball team in Central America, and one of the best in Latin America. Panama has medalled at multiple international tournaments at both junior and senior levels throughout the sport's history, including one silver medal and two bronze medals at the Baseball World Cup. They are currently the 12th ranked baseball team in the world.

Results and fixtures
The following is a list of professional baseball match results currently active in the latest version of the WBSC World Rankings, as well as any future matches that have been scheduled.

Legend

2019

2022

2023

Current roster

International Tournaments

2006

Panama was placed in Pool C of the inaugural World Baseball Classic, playing at Hiram Bithorn Stadium in Puerto Rico. In their opening game, they fell to hosts, 2-1, before losing to Cuba, 8-6, in extra innings. They concluded play with a 10-0, 7-inning loss to Netherlands, failing to get a hit off Dutch pitcher Shairon Martis.

2009

Panama once again was sent to Puerto Rico for the 2009 World Baseball Classic, this time as part of the double-elimination Pool D. They opened their campaign with a 7-0 defeat to Puerto Rico, setting up an elimination game against the Dominican Republic, which they lost 9-0. Having failed to score a single run, Panama finished in 15th place overall, just ahead of South Africa.

2013

After finishing last in their pool for the 2009 Classic, Panama was forced to  qualify for the 2013 edition. They were selected as the host for Qualifier 3 and were favored to qualify. However, they were upset by Brazil, 3-2, in their opener. After defeating Nicaragua and Colombia in elimination matches, they faced off with Brazil again. Despite having multiple Major League Baseball players to Brazil's one, Panama fell again, 1-0, and missed the 2013 World Baseball Classic.

2017

Panama was again forced to qualify for the 2017 edition. They were selected as the host for Qualifier 3. After defeating France in their opener they fell to Colombia. After defeating France again, they set up a rematch with Colombia but lost the elimination game after Colombia's Dilson Herrera hit a late homer.

2023

Baseball World Cup
Silver  :  2003
Bronze  : 1945, 2005

Central American Games
Gold  : , 
Silver  : 1977, 2013, 2017

Intercontinental Cup
Bronze  : 2002

Central American and Caribbean Games
Bronze  : 1930, 1959, 1982

U-15 Baseball World Cup
Silver  : 
: 4th

U-23 Baseball World Cup
2016: 4th
2021: 5th

Bolivarian Games
Gold  : 2001, 2009, 2013
Silver  : 1981, 1985, 1989, 2017
Bronze  : 1951, 1961, 1965, 1970, 1973

References

External links
Connor, Joe, Welcome to Panama. ESPN (MLB), January 17, 2006. Retrieved 2009-12-16.

Baseball
National baseball teams
Baseball in Panama